St John Branigan (c.1824 – 11 September 1873) was a New Zealand police commissioner. He was born in King's County, Ireland on c.1824.

He was recruited from Victoria, Australia after being highly recommended by the government there to head the Otago Police in 1861, at the start of the Otago Gold Rush to control the gold-generated turbulence from an expected influx of miners from Victoria and elsewhere. 

Later in the 1870s, he was also responsible to the general government for demilitarising the Armed Constabulary and turning it into a civilian police force, despite opposition from some provincial governments e.g. Auckland.

References
 

1820s births
1873 deaths
New Zealand police officers
Irish emigrants to New Zealand (before 1923)
People from County Offaly
19th-century New Zealand public servants